Šubrt (feminine Šubrtová) is a Czech surname, a Czechized version of the German surname Schubert. Notable people with the surname include:

 Michal Šubrt (born 1967), Czech rower
 Milada Šubrtová (1924–2011), Czech opera singer
 Miroslav Šubrt (1926–2012), Czech ice hockey executive
 Natália Šubrtová, Slovak alpine skier

Czech-language surnames
Surnames of German origin
Occupational surnames